The 1978 College Football All-America team is composed of college football players who were selected as All-Americans by various organizations and writers that chose College Football All-America Teams in 1978. The National Collegiate Athletic Association (NCAA) recognizes four selectors as "official" for the 1978 season. They are: (1) the American Football Coaches Association (AFCA) based on the input of more than 2,000 voting members; (2) the Associated Press (AP) selected based on the votes of sports writers at AP newspapers; (3) the Football Writers Association of America (FWAA) selected by the nation's football writers; and (4) the United Press International (UPI) selected based on the votes of sports writers at UPI newspapers.  Other selectors included Football News (FN), the Newspaper Enterprise Association (NEA), The Sporting News (TSN), and the Walter Camp Football Foundation (WC).

Offense

Receivers 

 Emanuel Tolbert, SMU 
 Kirk Gibson, Michigan State 
 Gordon Jones, Pittsburgh  
 Jerry Butler, Clemson 
 Junior Miller, Nebraska 
 Dave Petzke, Northern Illinois

Tight ends 
 Kellen Winslow, Missouri 
 Mark Brammer, Michigan State

Tackles 

 Keith Dorney, Penn St.
 Kelvin Clark, Nebraska 
 Jeff Toews, Washington 
 Matt Miller, Colorado 
 Robert Dugas, LSU 
 Anthony Muñoz, USC 
 Greg Kolenda, Arkansas 
 Craig Wolfley, Syracuse

Guards 

 Pat Howell, USC 
 Greg Roberts, Oklahoma 
 Joe Bostic, Clemson 
 Pete Inge, San Diego State 
 Steve Lindquist, Nebraska 
 Brad Budde, USC 
 Doug Panfil, Tulsa

Centers 

 Dave Huffman, Notre Dame 
 Jim Ritcher, North Carolina St. 
 Dwight Stephenson, Alabama 
 Robert Shaw, Tennessee 
 Chuck Brown, Houston

Quarterbacks 

 Chuck Fusina, Penn St. 
 Rick Leach, Michigan 
 Jack Thompson, Washington State 
 Steve Dils, Stanford 
 Steve Fuller, Clemson

Running backs 

 Billy Sims, Oklahoma 
 Charles Alexander, LSU 
 Charles White, USC 
 Ted Brown, North Carolina State 
 Eddie Lee Ivery, Georgia Tech 
 Darrin Nelson, Stanford 
 Willie McClendon, Georgia 
 Obie Graves, Cal State Fullerton 
 James Hadnot, Texas Tech 
 Joseph H. Holland, Cornell

Defense

Defensive ends 

 Al Harris,  Arizona St. 
 Hugh Green, Pittsburgh 
 Don Smith, Miami (Fla.) 
 George Andrews, Nebraska 
 Don Blackmon, Tulsa 
 Willie Jones, Florida State 
 John Adams, LSU 
 Chuck Schott, Army

Defensive tackles 

 Mike Bell,  Colorado St. 
 Bruce Clark,  Penn St. 
 Marty Lyons, Alabama 
 Matt Millen, Penn State 
 Dan Hampton, Arkansas 
 Jimmy Walker, Arkansas 
 Mike Stensrud, Iowa State 
 Ken Kremer, Ball State

Middle guards 

 Reggie Kinlaw, Oklahoma 
 Manu Tuiasosopo, UCLA 
 Ardis McCann, Louisiana Tech

Linebackers 

 Jerry Robinson, UCLA 
 Tom Cousineau, Ohio State  
 Bob Golic, Notre Dame 
 Ken Fantetti, Wyoming 
 Barry Krauss, Alabama 
 George Cumby, Oklahima 
 John Corker, Ohlahoma State 
 Daryl Hunt, Oklahoma 
 Michael Jackson, Washington 
 Joe Norman, Indiana 
 Jack Lazor, Kent State 
 Frank Manumaleuga, San Jose State

Defensive backs 

 Johnnie Johnson, Texas 
 Kenny Easley, UCLA 
 Jeff Nixon, Richmond 
 Lawrence Johnson, Wisconsin 
 Henry Williams,  San Diego St. 
 Rick Sanford, South Carolina 
 Pete Harris, Penn State 
 Don Bessillieu, Georgia Tech 
 Jeff Delaney, Pittsburgh 
 Lovie Smith, Tulsa 
 Russ Calabrese, Missouri 
 Tim Smith, Oregon State 
 Vaughn Lusby, Arkansas 
 Jason Coloma, Brigham Young 
 Nesby Glasgow, Washington 
 Joe Restic, Notre Dame

Special teams

Kickers 

 Matt Bahr, Penn State 
 Tony Franklin, Texas AM

Punters 

 Russell Erxleben, Texas  
 Joe Restic, Notre Dame

Key 
 Bold – Consensus All-American
 -1 – First-team selection
 -2 – Second-team selection
 -3 – Third-team selection

Official selectors

 AFCA – American Football Coaches Association, selected by 2,100 voting members for Kodak
 AP – Associated Press
 FWAA – Football Writers Association of America
 UPI – United Press International

Other selectors
 FN – Football News
 NEA – Newspaper Enterprise Association
 TSN – The Sporting News
 WC – Walter Camp Football Foundation

See also
 1978 All-Big Eight Conference football team
 1978 All-Big Ten Conference football team
 1978 All-Pacific-10 Conference football team
 1978 All-SEC football team

References

All-America Team
College Football All-America Teams